Peristethium is a genus of flowering plants belonging to the family Loranthaceae.

Its native range is Costa Rica to Southern Tropical America.

Species
Species:

Peristethium aequatoris 
Peristethium archeri 
Peristethium attenuatum 
Peristethium colombianum 
Peristethium confertiflorum 
Peristethium grahamii 
Peristethium lamprophyllum 
Peristethium leptostachyum 
Peristethium lojae 
Peristethium nitidum 
Peristethium palandense 
Peristethium peruviense 
Peristethium phaneroneurum 
Peristethium polystachyum 
Peristethium primarium 
Peristethium reticulatum 
Peristethium roraimense 
Peristethium tortistylum

References

Loranthaceae
Loranthaceae genera